Diederik van Silfhout (born 20 April 1988 in Ede, Netherlands) is a Dutch Olympic dressage rider. Representing the Netherlands, he competed at the 2016 Summer Olympics where he placed 4th in the team and 11th in the individual competitions.

Van Silfhout also competed at the 2014 World Equestrian Games in Normandy, France, where he won a team bronze medal and placed 9th in the freestyle dressage competition. He competed in Normandy as a late replacement for Danielle Heijkoop, who was forced to withdraw after her horse sustained injury.

He also competed at the 2015 European Dressage Championships in Aachen where he won a gold medal in team dressage. The Dutch national dressage coach Wim Ernes died on 1 November 2016 due to a brain tumor. Van Silfhout, together with the other gold medal winners Patrick van der Meer, Edward Gal and Hans Peter Minderhoud, carried his coffin during the funeral on 5 November 2016.

Personal bests

References

1988 births
Living people
Dutch male equestrians
Dutch dressage riders
People from Ede, Netherlands
Sportspeople from Gelderland
Olympic equestrians of the Netherlands
Equestrians at the 2016 Summer Olympics
21st-century Dutch people